San Benito is a town and municipality in the Santander Department in northeastern Colombia. 

Municipalities of Santander Department